Arre Deewano Mujhe Pehchano is an Indian reality show that aired on STAR Plus channel. The series premiered on 2 January 2009 and aired until 13 February 2009.

The show was hosted by Kavita Kaushik. The contestants included Gulshan Grover, Mahesh Manjrekar, Divya Dutta, Mandira Bedi and Mona Singh, Rakhi Sawant, Sweta Keswani and Yash Tonk.

References

External links
Arre Deewano Mujhe Pehchano Official Site

Indian reality television series
2009 Indian television series debuts
2009 Indian television series endings
StarPlus original programming